In geometry, the truncated great icosahedron (or great truncated icosahedron) is a nonconvex uniform polyhedron, indexed as U55. It has 32 faces (12 pentagrams and 20 hexagons), 90 edges, and 60 vertices. It is given a Schläfli symbol t{3,} or t0,1{3,} as a truncated great icosahedron.

Cartesian coordinates 
Cartesian coordinates for the vertices of a truncated great icosahedron centered at the origin are all the even permutations of

 (±1, 0, ±3/τ)
 (±2, ±1/τ, ±1/τ3)
 (±(1+1/τ2), ±1, ±2/τ)

where τ = (1+√5)/2 is the golden ratio (sometimes written φ). Using 1/τ2 = 1 − 1/τ one verifies that all vertices are on a sphere, centered at the origin, with the radius squared equal to 10−9/τ. The edges have length 2.

Related polyhedra 
This polyhedron is the truncation of the great icosahedron:

The truncated great stellated dodecahedron is a degenerate polyhedron, with 20 triangular faces from the truncated vertices, and 12 (hidden) pentagonal faces as truncations of the original pentagram faces, the latter forming a great dodecahedron inscribed within and sharing the edges of the icosahedron.

Great stellapentakis dodecahedron 

The great stellapentakis dodecahedron is a nonconvex isohedral polyhedron. It is the dual of the truncated great icosahedron. It has 60 intersecting triangular faces.

See also 
 List of uniform polyhedra

References

External links 
 
 
 Uniform polyhedra and duals

Uniform polyhedra